The 2012 UIM F1 H2O World Championship was the 29th season of Formula 1 Powerboat racing. Whilst a provisional calendar consisted of a total of nine rounds, following cancellations, an amended programme of six races, beginning in Doha, Qatar, on 10 March 2012, and ending in Sharjah, UAE, on 7 December 2012 was published by the UIM. At the penultimate race of the year in Abu Dhabi, reigning champion Alex Carella successfully defended his 2011 drivers' title, the Italian becoming a double world champion for the Qatar Team.

Teams and drivers

 Scott Gillman was initially entered into the Abu Dhabi GP as driving a BaBa hull, powered by a Hartley V8 four stroke engine based on a Suzuki Hayabusa motorcycle engine. He switched just before qualifying however to a Mercury 2.5-litre two stroke after feeling that the V8 was too powerful for the BaBa hull.

Team changes
The eight full-time teams from 2011 continued into 2012, with an additional ninth team, Caudwell Racing from South Africa, entered. Their entry was officially confirmed in June 2011, making history by introducing four-stroke engines into the series which had been dominated in recent times by the two-stroke Mercury engines. The revolutionary engine was based on an Infiniti road car engine and featured Cosworth pistons and conrods in its design.

With Russian driver Stanislav Kourtsenovsky moving to the CTIC China Team, the part-time Jetech Tools F1 Team from 2011 didn't participate in 2012. At the beginning of May, former German driver Fabian Kalsow announced his intention to re-enter the series with a team for the latter half of the 2012 season, with a longer-term view to an entry for 2013. This failed to materialise however, but despite that, two new teams lodged entries for the final two races of the year. Former champion Jonathan Jones' hull manufacturing firm Dragon entered with British driver Malcolm Goodman driving, and a second Emirati-based team, Skydive Dubai joined the series, with 2008 champion Jay Price, having last competed themselves in 2009.

Driver changes
Following the conclusion of the 2011 season, by far the biggest driver change for 2012 was the resignation of Jay Price from the Qatar Team. His replacement alongside newly crowned champion Alex Carella, was Shaun Torrente who had driven for the team alongside Price and Carella for the final two races of 2011. At the CTIC China Team, Pierre Lundin was replaced by Russian driver Stanislav Kourtsenovsky who had made two appearances during the 2011 season for the Jetech Tools F1 Team. F1 Atlantic Team signed Kuwaiti Youssef Al Rubayan for a full campaign in a third boat alongside the retained Tourre and Benavente whilst Filip Roms joined compatriot Sami Seliö at the Mad Croc team, replacing Davide Padovan. Ivan Brigada, having raced on one occasion for the Singha F1 Team in 2011, moved to the new Caudwell team for 2012 to partner South African Brett Stuart.

At the first race of the year in Qatar, Khalid Al Shamlan made a one-off appearance at his home event for the Qatar Team alongside Carella and Torrente. After the race however, Rhys Coles left Team Sweden. Having driven for them for the latter half of 2011, he had been retained for 2012, but parted ways following the Qatar race.

In the lead up to the fourth race of the season in China, then-championship leader Ahmed Al Hameli was diagnosed with a brain tumour, undergoing successful surgery in the US, but was forced to miss the Chinese round. His replacement was fellow Emirati Majed Al Mansoori. It would later transpire that Al Hameli would miss the remainder of the season. At the same race, Bimba Sjoholm made history by ensuring that two women would start an F1 Powerboat World Championship race for the first time when she drove the second Team Sweden boat that had been vacated since Rhys Coles left the team. She drove a brand new Molgaard hull, with teammate Jonas Andersson having debuted his at the previous race in Ukraine, switching from his previous BaBa.

Following the race in China, Shaun Torrente had his Superlicence withdrawn by the UIM and banned for the next two races after his sixth crash in just ten races, this time also forcing Sami Seliö into retirement, and thus all but ending the Finn's championship hopes. Two weeks before the Abu Dhabi race, fellow American Terry Rinker was announced as Torrente's replacement.

As the season entered its final stages, further changes took place throughout the field. Prior to the race in Abu Dhabi, the penultimate round of the season, along with Rinker, a further five new drivers came into the series. Team Sweden announced that recently crowned double F2 champion Erik Stark would replace Bimba Sjoholm for the rest of the year. In addition, Malcolm Goodman returned to F1 as British F2 champion having had a previous outing in 2009, and would race for the new Dragon F1 Team. Jay Price made his return to the series having left the Qatar Team following the 2011 season in acrimonious circumstances, entering with the other new team, Skydive Dubai, whilst fellow American and multiple champion Scott Gillman returned to the cockpit in a third Team Abu Dhabi boat. Gillman initially intended to trial a new Hartley four stroke V8 engine but later abandoned the experiment prior to qualifying, instead reverting to the normal Mercury two stroke. Finally for Abu Dhabi, Xiong Ziwei became only the second Chinese driver to enter an F1 powerboat race, driving a third boat for the CTIC China Team.

For the final round of the year in Sharjah, Team Abu Dhabi went back to a two boat team, after the difficulties with the Hartley four stroke engine. Scott Gillman continued on with driving duties though, replacing Majed Al Mansoori in the No. 6 boat for his third race start in five years.

Season calendar

Initial plans for the 2012 season included an expanded calendar of nine events, two more than 2011. The round at Portimao was dropped, with new races planned for Venice, St Petersburg, and Perth. Following the first race at Doha, on 23 March, an amended calendar was released with just five further confirmed races, and an additional event in November still to be finalised. Ultimately however, the calendar was further shortened to six races when plans for the expected fifth round were abandoned, with the date removed from the series' official website in late October.

Results and standings
Points were awarded to the top 10 classified finishers. A maximum of two boats per team were eligible for points in the teams' championship.

Drivers standings

Teams standings
Only boats with results eligible for points counting towards the teams' championship are shown here.

References

External links
 The official website of the UIM F1 H2O World Championship
 The official website of the Union Internationale Motonautique

F1 Powerboat World Championship
Formula 1 Powerboat seasons
F1 Powerboat World Championship